The Embassy of Haiti in London is the diplomatic mission of Haiti in the United Kingdom. It is located in Swedenborg House in the Bloomsbury district.

It was formerly located just off Cavendish Square in Marylebone in a Grade II listed building; the exterior has a blue plaque commemorating the architect George Edmund Street who lived in the building.

Gallery

References

Haiti
Diplomatic missions of Haiti
Haiti–United Kingdom relations
Buildings and structures in the City of Westminster
Marylebone